Tauno Uolevi Raade (5 July 1912 – 13 May 1998) was a Finnish industrialist and a long-time managing director of Neste (now Neste Oil), the Finnish national oil refining company.

Raade was born in Turku, and received university degrees from Helsinki University of Technology (TKK) and Åbo Akademi. At TKK, he was one of the founders of the student flying club. During the Second World War he initially served as a fighter pilot, but was soon transferred into the industry. In 1945, he was appointed the director of Ministry of Trade and Industry, where he planned the payment of war reparations stipulated by the Soviet Union.

Already in this role he was involved in the founding of the Finnish oil industry. In 1955, he was appointed managing director of Neste. The first oil refinery at Naantali was brought on stream a couple of years after this. Raade and his friend, Prime Minister and from 1956 President of the Republic Urho Kekkonen were responsible for promoting the project; Kekkonen rallied the politicians and Raade took care of relations to industry at home and abroad.

In 1959, Raade also became the chairman of the company's board. He acted in both positions until his retirement in 1979. In addition to this post, he was also active in industrial federations and committees and was a member or chairman of the board of 37 corporations. He received the honorary title of vuorineuvos (the highest one awarded to industrialists) in 1962.

The former headquarters building of Neste, now occupied by Fortum, is colloquially called Raateen hammas "Raade's tooth". It was constructed 1973–78 and is still the tallest office building in Finland.

References
Obituary for Uolevi Raade at MTV3

1912 births
1998 deaths
20th-century Finnish businesspeople
People from Turku
Neste people
Aalto University alumni
Åbo Akademi University alumni